Curtis "Wall Street" Carroll is a prisoner in California’s San Quentin State Prison, serving a sentence of 54 years to life for murder. He has earned the nickname "Wall Street" and “The Oracle of San Quentin”.

Early life 
Carroll was born in Washington, D.C. and later moved to East Oakland, where he grew up, amidst the crack epidemic in the United States. His mother was a waitress at a bowling alley and the family was often on welfare. He later befriended his mother's drug dealer, who taught him to steal quarters from arcade machines. Carroll was eventually caught and sentenced to juvenile hall.

Prison 
In 1996, at 17 years old, he murdered a man in a botched robbery attempt. Carroll turned himself in and received a 54 years-to-life sentence. He was illiterate when he was imprisoned but learned to read and write at the age of 20.

Caroll became interested in the stock market after realizing its financial potential. He learned about the markets through the newspapers' financial sections. He got his start investing in penny stocks by cashing in unused postage stamps he bought with revenue from his tobacco sales to other prisoners.

Transfer to San Quentin Prison 
Carroll was transferred to San Quentin Prison in 2012.

Financial literacy courses 
Carroll along with fellow inmate Troy Williams, started the Financial Literacy Program. Together they created F.E.E.L (Financial Empowerment Emotional Literacy).

Caroll teaches a financial literacy class with Zak Williams, the son of comedian Robin Williams and a graduate of Columbia Business School. The class educates inmates on how inmates can develop skills applicable to life outside prison.

Philosophy 
Carroll's philosophy is that most crime is attributed to a lack of financial security, which has led him to teach other San Quentin State Prison inmates about the stock market.

See also 
 Juvenile court
 Defense of infancy
 American juvenile justice system

References

External links 
 Project FEEL in the news
 Curtis Carroll TED talk

American financial traders
American prisoners sentenced to life imprisonment
Living people
San Quentin State Prison
San Quentin State Prison inmates
1978 births